The Chronicle of Rivius is a German-language manuscript often cited by Teodor Narbutt in his nine-volume work on the history of Lithuania and journal articles. Supposedly written between 1697 and 1730s by Jan Fryderyk Rivius, the chronicle remains unpublished. Lithuanian researcher Artūras Dubonis pointed out many inconsistencies in its authorship, unclear provenance, factual and chronological fallacies, and concluded that it is most likely a forgery, though more extensive study is required for a conclusive determination.

Provenance
According to Narbutt, he accidentally purchased the manuscript in Reval in 1808. He first made references to the chronicle in articles published in 1817. Narbutt did not cite page numbers of the chronicle in his work, though the pages are numbered and he cited the page numbers of the Bychowiec Chronicle. Narbutt prepared a Polish translation of the most important parts of the chronicle and intended to publish it in a collection of primary sources on the history of Lithuania. However, the chronicle remains unpublished and is kept, along with the Narbutt's translation, at the Library of the Lithuanian Academy of Sciences.

Content
The chronicle is written in German with some phrases in Latin and words in Latvian. Narbutt analyzed the chronicle and claimed that it used an earlier Russian chronicle, compiled by Mitrofan, a monk in Pinsk. This work by Mitrofan was used both by Rivius and by Augustinus Rotundus for his long-lost history. Thus, according to Narbutt, the Chronicle of Rivius preserved some unique fragments of Rotundus' work. Narbutt lamented that fragments of Rotundus work, including two genealogical tables, were lost when the last pages of the manuscript burned during a fire at his library in 1838. However, the surviving manuscript shows no fire damage.

The chronicle contains many obviously wrong and incorrect facts. For example, it claims that in 1276 a woman gave birth to 346 babies or that Turks made an assault on Belgrade in 1717. The chronicle also contains many unique, otherwise unknown, facts from the history of Lithuania. For example, Lithuanian and Samogitian golden coins from the 13th century, a Lithuanian pagan flag with a cock on the tip of the pole, an inscription on the tombstone of King Mindaugas, a description of the Perkūnas shrine in the Šventaragis' Valley in Vilnius. Some events are described differently in the chronicle than in Narbutt's works. In his comments to the translation, Narbutt even debated which version is more correct (though both are proved wrong by the 13th-century Livonian Rhymed Chronicle).

Author
Narbutt referred to the chronicle as Kronika niemiecka J. F. R. (German Chronicle of J. F. R.) and revealed its author to be Jan Fryderyk Rivius (1673–1730/1735), grandson of Johann Rivius (1528–1596). The biography also repeated some mistakes found in these encyclopedias. Also, the 77-year gap between grandfather's death and grandson's birth is virtually impossible. The chronicle makes no mention of Rivius' father or his own life, other than he was born in Königsberg and in 1689 moved to Courland, where he worked as a pastor after pastor Grott moved to Libau. The exact same information about Grott was presented to Narbutt by Napiersky in a letter written in April 1833. Other researchers pointed out a Johannes Fridericus Ruvius from Wenden who became a student at the University of Dorpat in 1690, but Rivius was from Königsberg and it is unlikely that he "forgot" to mention his university education. Therefore, researcher Artūras Dubonis concluded that Rivius' biography was invented between 1833 and 1842.

References

German chronicles
Lithuanian chronicles
Literary forgeries
18th-century history books